Speedy Katisho Mashilo (born 27 December 1965) is a South African politician who is currently the Member of the Executive Council (MEC) for Human Settlements in Mpumalanga, as well as both the deputy provincial chairperson and acting provincial treasurer of the local branch of the African National Congress (ANC).

Political career
Mashilo became Nkangala district mayor in 2010, having previously served as district mayor of Ekangala. He lost the post of chairman of the ANC in Nkangala briefly in 2013 when the provincial executive was dissolved.

Following the ANC's poor performance in Nkangala during the 2014 election, the ANC provincial executive committee decided that Mashilo would no longer serve as district mayor and become a member of the National Council of Provinces instead. Mashilo turned down the offer and resigned as district mayor. In 2015, Mashilo became a member of the Mpumalanga Provincial Legislature.

In September 2017, Nkangala ANC branches called to remove Mashilo as their regional chairman when it emerged that Mashilo had a property in Bronkhorstspruit, Gauteng, listed as his residence. They questioned how he was appointed as a Mpumalanga MEC when he did not qualify. When asked in an interview Mashilo did not deny that he lived in Bronkhorstspruit, saying that for years he had held several leadership positions in the province and at local government level and that nobody had brought up those questions.

In March 2018, he became the MEC for Cooperative Governance and Traditional Affairs.

In 2019, Mashilo was excluded from the Mpumalanga executive council by Premier Refilwe Mtsweni-Tsipane with The Citizen describing it as an "unexpected move that ignited political shock waves in the province". Furthermore, it said that the sidelining of Mashilo marked the beginning of a process to "purge" certain leaders that were said to be threat to her power.

Following premier Mtsweni-Tsipane's cabinet reshuffle in 2021, Mashilo was reappointed to the cabinet as the MEC for Human Settlements.

Kidnapping and aftermath
In November 2021, Mashilo was kidnapped for seven hours whilst driving on the R568 road between Ekangala and KwaMhlanga. According to Mpumalanga police spokesperson Brigadier Selvy Mohlala, his Toyota Hilux, R25,000 in cash and a hunting rifle with 25 rounds of ammunition were stolen from him. The hijackers also asked him for his pin numbers and withdrew R80,000 from several of his bank cards.

In April 2022, Mashilo was elected deputy provincial chairperson of the ANC in Mpumalanga with 505 votes, beating David Nhlabathi who got 209 votes. He was then appointed as acting provincial treasurer of Mpumalanga, after Mandla Msibi stepped aside due to attempted murder charges. Mashilo will continue to act as treasurer until Msibi’s court case has been finalised.

Mashilo was the acting premier of Mpumalanga from 25 July to 5 August 2022 when Refilwe Mtsweni-Tsipane was out of the country, attending the 24th International Aids Conference in Montreal, Canada.

See also
 List of kidnappings

References

External links

1965 births
21st-century South African politicians
African National Congress politicians
Formerly missing people
Living people
Kidnapped politicians
Kidnapped South African people
Kidnappings in South Africa
Members of the Mpumalanga Provincial Legislature